Ostravice is a river in Moravian-Silesian Region, Czech Republic. It originates in the Moravian-Silesian Beskids and then flows through Ostravice, Frýdlant nad Ostravicí, Frýdek-Místek and Paskov to Ostrava where it enters the Oder as its right tributary.

The river starts as the Ostravice after the confluence of the Bílá Ostravice (i.e., White Ostravice, considered its main source) and the Černá Ostravice (i.e. Black Ostravice). They are both streams flowing through deeply forested valleys which are important access roads to the resorts of Bílá and Bílý Kříž. Ostravice then creates a fresh water reservoir behind Šance Dam, for the industrial region around Ostrava finished in 1970.

The Ostravice then flows through the rolling hills region between Ostravice and Frýdek-Místek and finally through the lowlands of the highly industrial Ostrava basin.

It partly forms the border between historical regions Moravia (left bank) and Silesia (more precisely Cieszyn Silesia) (right bank). It was first agreed as such in 1261 by a special treaty between Władysław Opolski, Duke of Opole and Racibórz and Ottokar II of Bohemia. Later it was confirmed on 2 August 1297 between Mieszko I, Duke of Cieszyn and Dětřich, bishop of Olomouc. It lost importance as a state border in 1327, when the Duchy of Teschen became a fee of the Kingdom of Bohemia.

See also
 List of rivers of the Czech Republic

References

Sources 
 
 
 

Rivers of the Moravian-Silesian Region
Moravian-Silesian Beskids
Frýdek-Místek District
Cieszyn Silesia